The Vincent Graves Greene Philatelic Research Foundation is based in Ontario, Canada.

History 
The Foundation was formed in 1975 through a series of gifts from the renowned Canadian philatelist, Vincent Graves Greene.

Legal status 
The Foundation is incorporated and registered as a charitable organization for Canadian tax purposes.

Governance 
The Foundation is overseen by a Board of Directors. Since 2006 the Honorary Chairman of the Board has been the philatelist Kenneth Rowe.

Purpose of the foundation 
The Foundation website states that:

The primary purpose of the Foundation is to encourage and promote research in the fields of philately and postal history. To carry out this purpose the Foundation is empowered to raise and distribute funds, to enter into arrangements with various authorities and to employ staff as necessary to attain its objectives.

Five main functions of the foundation

1) The establishment and maintenance of a comprehensive library for research and study purposes.

2) The provision of expertization service for the validation of Canadian philatelic and postal history items.

3) To conduct or support lecture programmes or courses of study designed to improve and expand the knowledge of Canadian philatelists and postal historians.

4) To encourage, participate and organize philatelic and postal history exhibitions, competitions and displays.

5) To underwrite and publish philatelic and postal history research work in various formats.

Publications 
The Foundation is an active publisher of works relating to Canadian philately.

Expertisation 
The Foundation provides an expertisation service for philatelic items from British North America and since 1976 has issued over 18500 expert opinions. The Foundation is a member of the Association of International Philatelic Experts (AIEP).

Library 
The Foundation library is named The Harry Sutherland Philatelic Library.

External links 
 Foundation website

Philatelic organizations